Beau van Erven Dorens (born 24 December 1970) is a Dutch television presenter, actor and voice actor. He is known for presenting many television programs, including Deal or No Deal, RTL Boulevard, Het Zesde Zintuig and Beau Five Days Inside.

Career 

He played roles in episodes of several television series, including Goede tijden, slechte tijden (in 1997), Gooische vrouwen (in 2005 and 2006), Dokter Tinus (in 2013) and Bagels & Bubbels (in 2015). In 2001, he played the role of  Fraser in the film I Love You Too. The film was a success at the box office and became the first film to receive the Golden Film award, which is awarded to films from the Netherlands once they have sold 100,000 tickets.

In 2008 and 2009, he starred as team captain in the television game show Ik hou van Holland for three seasons. He also appeared as contestant on the show in 2012 and 2015.

In 2009, he presented Hole in the wall, the Dutch adaptation of the Japanese television show Brain Wall, together with Gerard Joling. From August 2009 till April 2010 he was also one of the presenters of the Dutch adaptation of the Argentine television show Caiga Quien Caiga (CQC). He presented the show alongside Pieter Jouke and Daan Nieber. Unlike adaptations in many other countries, the Dutch adaptation of CQC was not very successful. In 2010, he also presented De Zaterdagavondshow met Marc-Marie & Beau (Dutch for The Saturday Night Show with Marc-Marie & Beau) with Marc-Marie Huijbregts which also wasn't very successful; only four episodes were broadcast. The year was further marked by the death of his friend Antonie Kamerling who committed suicide at the age of 44.

He was the narrator in the 2014 edition of The Passion, a Dutch Passion Play held every Maundy Thursday since 2011.

In 2018, he won the Gouden Televizier-Ring award for the television show Beau Five Days Inside. That year he also won the Zilveren Televizier-Ster for best presenter. In 2019, he won the Televizier-Ster award for best presenter.

In 2019, he presented the television show De Sleutel ('The Key'). In the show, he shares the stories of several homeless people and he offers them a place to live. He also started presenting his own talk show Beau which is the successor of the previous late night talk show RTL Late Night. He alternates every four months with Eva Jinek and she presents her talk show Jinek. In 2019, he also appeared in one episode of De TV kantine playing the character of BeaulaLinda in a parody of RuPaul's Drag Race.

In 2021, he presented Beau in Floradorp in which he followed the lives of people living in Floradorp, Amsterdam, Netherlands.

, he is scheduled to appear in the Videoland series Hockeyvaders. Van Erven Dorens is also a co-creator of the series. , he is working on a television show about poverty in the Netherlands.

In November and December 2022, he presented the show Isola di Beau in which he interviewed two guests in Sardinia, Italy. The show is the successor to the show Lago di Beau which also aired in 2022.

Filmography

As presenter 

 Deal or No Deal (2006–2009)
 Het Zesde Zintuig (2008)
 Caiga Quien Caiga (2009, 2010)
 De Zaterdagavondshow met Marc-Marie & Beau (2010)
 5 jaar later (2018)
 Beau Five Days Inside (2018, 2019)
 De Sleutel (2019)
 Beau (2019–present)
 Weet Ik Veel (2020–present)
 Beau Blijft Binnen (2020)
 Beau in Floradorp (2021)
 Lago di Beau (2022)
 Isola di Beau (2022)

As contestant 

 Ik hou van Holland (2012, 2015)
 Weet Ik Veel (2013)

As actor 

 Goede tijden, slechte tijden (1997)
 I Love You Too (2001)
 Gooische vrouwen (2005, 2006)
 Man & Paard (2006)
 De TV kantine (episode, 2019)
 Hockeyvaders (Videoland, 2023)

References

External links

 

1970 births
Living people
Dutch male voice actors
20th-century Dutch male actors
21st-century Dutch male actors
Dutch game show hosts
Dutch television talk show hosts
People from Haarlem